Samuel, Son & Co. is a Canadian multinational company specializing in metal processing, distribution, and industrial products. As of 2018, the company has over 5,200 employees and is one of the largest processors and distributors of metal products in North America.

History
Samuel, Son & Co. was founded by brothers Mark and Lewis Samuel in 1855 as "M & L Samuel" in Downtown Toronto. The company operated out of the Coffin Block Building until 1881.  In 1907, a larger location was built at King Street and Spadina Avenue in Toronto's Garment District (now the Entertainment District).

In 1931, ownership of the company was transferred to Sigmund Samuel, and it was renamed as Samuel, Son & Co. In 1956, Samuel expanded into the Montreal area with the opening of "Samuel & Fils", their first location outside of Toronto. In 1960, Samuel moved their headquarters to neighbouring Mississauga as the construction of the Gardiner Expressway provided growth west of Toronto.

On April 29, 1962, Sigmund Samuel died, leaving Ernest Samuel as his successor. In 1963, the "Samuel Strapping Systems" division was founded, which manufactures a range of packaging and strapping products. The following year, Samuel founded "Kim-Tam Logistics" in 1964 as a solution to handle the growing demands of their metal processing business.

Acquisitions

In 1972, Bothwell Steel and Nelson Steel were both acquired by Samuel.

Around 1991, Samuel purchased the Ontario portion of Wilkinson Steel, and Wilkinson acquired the western divisions of Samuel. Under agreement of neither company operating in each others respective locations. Upon the agreements end, Samuel returned to Western Canada. 

On March 28, 2013, it was announced that Wilkinson Steel would be acquired by Samuel. The merger more than doubled the company's presence in the Western Canadian market. The deal was finalized in May 2013.

On December 13, 2013, Evraz sold their coil processing facility in Surrey, British Columbia to Samuel.

On November 15, 2017, Samuel announced the acquisition of Main Steel of Elk Grove Village, Illinois, with operations in four U.S. states.

On May 4, 2018, it was announced that Samuel would acquire CAID Industries Inc. of Tucson, Arizona.

On July 12, 2018, Samuel announced that they would acquire Sierra Aluminum of Riverside, California.

On June 1, 2021, Samuel announced that they had acquired Systematix Inc. of Waterloo, Ontario.

References

External links

Samuel Family Foundation

Companies based in Ontario
Privately held companies of Canada
Metal companies of Canada
1855 establishments in Ontario